This is a list of Colorado Avalanche award winners. It also includes players and data from the previous incarnation of the franchise, the Quebec Nordiques.

League awards

Team trophies

Individual awards

All-Stars

WHA First and Second Team All-Stars

NHL first and second team All-Stars
The NHL first and second team All-Stars are the top players at each position as voted on by the Professional Hockey Writers' Association.

NHL All-Rookie Team

The NHL All-Rookie Team consists of the top rookies at each position as voted on by the Professional Hockey Writers' Association.

All-Star Game selections
The National Hockey League All-Star Game is a mid-season exhibition game held annually between many of the top players of each season. Thirty-three All-Star Games have been held since the Colorado Avalanche entered the NHL as the Quebec Nordiques in 1979, with at least one player chosen to represent the franchise in each year except 2012. The All-Star game has not been held in various years: 1995, 2005, and 2013 as a result of labor stoppages, 2006, 2010, and 2014 because of the Winter Olympic Games, and 2021 as a result of the COVID-19 pandemic. Colorado has hosted one of the games. The 51st was held at the Pepsi Center.

 Selected by fan vote
 Selected by Commissioner
 Selected as one of four "last men in" by fan vote
 All-Star Game Most Valuable Player

All-Star Game replacement events
The Quebec Nordiques hosted Rendez-vous '87 at Le Colisée.

 Selected by fan vote

Career achievements

Hockey Hall of Fame

The following is a list of Colorado Avalanche and Quebec Nordiques who have been enshrined in the Hockey Hall of Fame.

Lester Patrick Trophy
The Lester Patrick Trophy has been presented by the National Hockey League and USA Hockey since 1966 to honor a recipient's contribution to ice hockey in the United States. This list includes all personnel who have ever been employed by the Colorado Avalanche in any capacity and have also received the Lester Patrick Trophy.

United States Hockey Hall of Fame

Retired numbers

The Colorado Avalanche have retired six of their jersey numbers. The four numbers retired by the franchise when they were in Quebec – J. C. Tremblay's number 3, Marc Tardif's number 8, Michel Goulet's number 16, and Peter Stastny's number 26 – were un-retired and put back into circulation when the franchise moved to Colorado. Also out of circulation is the number 99 which was retired league-wide for Wayne Gretzky on February 6, 2000. Gretzky did not play for the Avalanche franchise during his 20-year NHL career and no player in franchise history had ever worn the number 99 prior to its retirement.

Defunct team awards

O'Keefe Cup
The O'Keefe Cup was an annual award given to the player who earned the most points from Star of the game selections throughout the regular season. It was discontinued when the franchise moved to Colorado in 1995.

Other awards

Notes

Shared with Patrik Elias of the New Jersey Devils.

References
Colorado Avalanche Database
The Internet Hockey Database
Colorado Avalanche Official Web Site

Colorado Avalanche
award
Awards